Malietoa Tanumafili II  (4 January 1913 – 11 May 2007), addressed Susuga Malietoa Tanumafili II, was the Malietoa, the title of one of Samoa's four paramount chiefs, and the head of state, or O le Ao o le Malo, a position that he held for life, of Samoa from 1962 to 2007. He was co-head of state in 1962 with the tama-a-'aiga Tupua Tamasese Mea'ole and became the sole head of state on 15 April 1963 upon the death of his co-regent. At the time of his death, he was the oldest national leader in the world, and was also the last incumbent president-for-life in the world. His Highness Malietoa Tanumafili II was also the first head of state to be a follower of the Bahá’í Faith.

The Malietoa is one of the four tama-a-'aiga (maximal lineage) titles of Samoa, alongside Tupua Tamasese, Mata-afa and Tuimalealiifano.

Following an extended period deliberation, the Malietoa title passed to his eldest son, Malietoa Fa’amausili Molī.

Early and personal life
His Highness was born on 4 January 1913 as the son and third child of his parents, Malietoa Tanumafili I and Momoe Lupeuluiva Meleisea. He was chosen as the Mālietoa in 1940 following his father's death on 5 July 1939.

Tanumafili was educated at the government run Leififi School in Samoa.  He went on to enroll at St. Stephen's School and Wesley College in Pukekohe, both of which are in New Zealand. Malietoa was an active athlete during his younger years. His favourite sports included boxing, rugby and cricket. Malietoa's interest in sports continued throughout his life and he was an avid golfer well into his 90s. He could often be seen driving his golf cart around Samoa.

His wife, Lili Tunu, died in 1986. Tanumafili had eleven children during his life; one child died in infancy, while two of his sons, Papalii Laupepa and Papaliitele Eti, died in 1985 and 2005 respectively. His eight other children are his sons Sua Vainuupo, Afioga Malietoa Papaliitele Faamausili Molī (the current holder of the Malietoa title), Papaliitele Titiuatoa, Papaliitele Ioane, Papaliitele Douglas and his daughters Seiuli Tutai, Lola Tosi (mother-in-law of Tongan prince Lord Ma'atu) and Momoe. At the time of his death, he had four surviving children – two sons and two daughters.

Malietoa Tanumafili II was a follower of the Baháʼí Faith. He was the first President and the first serving head of state to be a member of the religion. He announced his belief via official letterhead on Friday 30 March 1973. Following his letter, on Monday 7 May 1973, the Universal House of Justice announced to the Bahá’ís of the World that a reigning monarch, His Highness Malietoa Tanumafili II, had accepted the Message of Bahá’u’lláh. On Saturday 27 January 1979 Malietoa laid the foundational cornerstone of the Baháʼí House of Worship in Tiapapata, eight kilometres from the country's capital of Apia. The temple was subsequently dedicated by him at completion on Saturday 1 September 1984.

Public life

Tanumafili officially inherited the royal title of Malietoa in 1940, following the 1939 death of his father, Malietoa Tanumafili I, though some media reports claim that he received the title of Malietoa in 1939. Soon after becoming Malietoa, he was appointed to serve as a special adviser, also called Fautua, to the New Zealand administration and governor of Samoa, known as the New Zealand Trusteeship of Samoa, until independence in 1962.

Chiefdom of State
Upon Samoa's independence in 1962, Malietoa Tanumafili II became  O le Ao o le Malo, or head of state for a lifetime term, jointly with Tupua Tamasese Mea'ole. Tanumafili and Mea'ole would serve jointly as head of state for just 16 months. When Mea'ole died in 1963, Tanumafili became the sole head of state, a post he held for life until his death in 2007. He is often credited for providing much of the stability that Samoa has enjoyed post independence.

Malietoa travelled extensively during his term as O le Ao o le Malo. He travelled to the People's Republic of China for an official state visit in 1976. The Chinese government hosted him with a banquet on the eve of Wednesday 8 September 1976. That very evening, 10 minutes after the stroke of midnight Mao Zedong passed away. Malietoa then proceeded to the United Kingdom whereupon he visited the graveside of Shoghi Effendi, first and last Guardian of the Baháʼí Administrative Order, the following Sunday 12 September.

Additionally, during his term he also visited Australia, Fiji, Hawaii, Japan, New Zealand, South Korea, Tonga, the United Kingdom and the former West Germany. Malietoa Tanumafili was among the foreign dignitaries who attended the funeral of Japanese Emperor Showa in 1989.

Malietoa Tanumafili II was described as the last survivor of a generation of important Pacific leaders who guided their countries and peoples from colonialism to independence. His death was the latest in a string of recent, high-profile passings of members of this Pacific generation of leaders, which included Fijian Prime Minister and later President, Ratu Sir Kamisese Mara, the King of Tonga, Taufa'ahau Tupou IV, and New Zealand's Maori Queen, Dame Te Atairangikaahu.

Death
Malietoa Tanumafili II died at 18:45 on Friday 11 May 2007, at the Tupua Tamasese Meaole National Hospital at Motoʻotua in Apia, Samoa. He was being treated as a patient for pneumonia at the hospital for approximately a week. He died from a heart attack.

His death was announced by Samoan Secretary of State Vaasatia Poloma Komiti on SBC TV1. "It is with deepest regret that we inform you of the passing of our Head of State Malietoa Tanumafili II."

Malietoa Tanumafili II was the world's third longest serving living head of state at the time of his death in May 2007 after Thailand's King Bhumibol Adulyadej, who reigned from 1946 until his death in 2016 and Britain's Queen Elizabeth II, who reigned from 1952 until her death in 2022, as well as the longest serving incumbent President (succeeded by Gabon's Omar Bongo).

Funeral
Samoa entered a state of official mourning from the time of the Malietoa's death until his official funeral.  All Samoan flags were lowered to half mast in his honour and remembrance. According to tradition, thousands of Samoans were expected to wear white and black as a sign of respect for the Malietoa from 15 May until his state funeral on 18 May. The government of Samoa encouraged traditional Samoan dress for the funeral. Samoans were requested specifically to wear "a black lavalava or sulu and a white top with traditional elei patterns." Samoans were also asked to include the teuila flower, the national flower of Samoa, with their mourning attire.

Malietoa Tanumafili II's body was taken from a private funeral home (Ligaliga Funeral) to his residence at Fa'ato'ialemanu on 16 May, which marked the beginning of his funeral services. Hundreds of the Malietoa's close and extended relatives, including his children, attended a special private family service that night.

The state funeral was a rare occasion when ancient rituals and exchanges were made to the Sa Malietoa (one of national political 'families’ or clans from which the Malietoa title belongs). Traditional cultural presentations (or Si'i Fa'atupu) from other districts and clans from within Samoa were made and ancient funeral rites were performed. The delegation (or auala) from Lufilufi and Falefa, representing the Tui Atua, circled the maota of Malietoa at Faatoialemanu where the late Malietoa lay in state, chanting the ancient funeral chants associated with the district of Atua (where the Tui Atua is the paramount papa title) and its relationship with the district of Tuamasaga (where the Malietoa is the paramount title). Traditional delegations representing the Tongan Royal Family and the Fijian Great Council of Chiefs also made cultural presentations to reflect the ancient genealogical ties between Samoa and her southern neighbours Tonga and Fiji.

The major village of the Malietoa title, Malie, played a major role in funeral ceremonies and exchanges. The 'aumaga (untitled men) of Malie, called the Aumaga a Laauli, and the 'aumaga (untitled men) of Falealili, called the Manu Samoa, provided hundreds of traditional guards in and around the compounds where the Malietoa lay in state. They also patrolled the roads around Faatoialemanu and provided escorting duties whenever the body was moved. On the day of the funeral the grounds of Tiafau Malae where the funeral was held were guarded by 300 men of the Aumaga a Laauli. Presiding over the body was the Salelesi (the ancient herald or 'dog' of the Malietoa and Tupua Tamasese), from the village of Salelesi (District of Atua). His role is to guard the body, herald its presence and escort it into the tomb. All villages in the District of Tuamasaga and other villages connected to the Malietoa title cut palm leaves and branches of hundreds of coconut trees and laid them by the side of main roads in an ancient mark of mourning for the death of a paramount chief.

The Malietoa's body was then moved to the Samoan Parliament to lie in state on 17 May. His funeral was held on 18 May in Apia.

International reaction

 – Queen Elizabeth II stated: "I have learned with great sadness of the death of His Highness Malietoa Tanumafili II. I recall with pleasure my visit to Samoa, with Prince Philip, in 1977. I could see then the great affection and respect which the people of Samoa felt for him, earned by a long record of service to his nation. His Highness's passing will be mourned widely throughout the Commonwealth. Prince Philip joins me in sending our condolences to the Samoan people."

 – President George W. Bush stated: "On behalf of the American people, I extend my deepest condolences to you and the people of Samoa on the death of His Highness Malietoa Tanumafili II. For forty-five years, Malietoa promoted democracy, prosperity and peace in his country and in the Pacific — values that we in the United States also share. Malietoa fostered a close relationship between our countries and peoples, especially through his contact with American Samoa. His regular visits to American Samoa for the annual Flag Day festivities, along with his sincerity, goodwill and humility, will be greatly missed. As you and the people of Samoa mourn the loss of His Highess Malietoa Tanumafili II, please know that the people of the United States stand at your side."

 – General Secretary of the Communist Party of China Hu Jintao stated: "I was shocked and saddened to learn of the passing away of His Highness, Malietoa Tanumafili II, Head of State of the Independent State of Samoa. On behalf of the Government and people of the People's Republic of China, and in my own name, I wish to convey our deepest sympathy and sincerest condolences to the Government and people of Samoa, and to the bereaved family of His Highness. His Highness was a statesman of noble character and high prestige who made outstanding contributions to the independence and development of Samoa. As Head of State of Samoa, he was not only friendly to China but was also committed to maintaining and promoting the cordial and cooperative relations between Samoa and China, which the Chinese people will never forget. I hope and believe that the cause of friendship initiated by His Highness will be continuously consolidated and strengthened with joint efforts by both the Samoan and Chinese Governments."

 – Prime Minister Helen Clark reacted to the news of Tanumafili's death: "Through his long reign as Head of State, Malietoa represented Samoa with wisdom, humour and insight.... Malietoa was educated at St. Stephens School near Auckland. He was a great friend of New Zealand as Head of State, and was well known to successive New Zealand governments and diplomats.... It is significant that New Zealand has a Treaty of Friendship with only one country — Samoa — and our shared unique relationship was due in no small part to Malietoa's influence as a father of modern Samoa. New Zealanders of Samoan descent, together with their palagi counterparts, will be thinking of Samoa, at this sad time."

 – President Thabo Mbeki issued a statement of support to Samoan government:  "It is with a sense of great sadness and shock that we have learnt of the passing away of His Highness, King Malietoa Tanumafili II on Friday, 11 May 2007. Despite this sad loss to the Samoan nation and people, the King will be long remembered for his passionate and committed service to Samoa and the broader Pacific Islands region.... It was a testimony to his astute leadership that for the past 15 years Samoa had stood as a beacon of hope, stability and progress in the Pacific. South Africa therefore applauded the achievements of the King for having been a powerful and resonating voice for democracy and good governance, as well as in articulating the development challenges unique to small developing island states."

 – Governor Togiola Tulafono stated: "I offer my condolence to the people and government of Samoa on the passing of His Highness Malietoa Tanumafili.  May God guide the people of Samoa as they mourn his passing." Many American Samoans considered Tanumafili to be the father of both Samoa and American Samoa. Tanumafili was a frequent visitor to the American territory's Flag Day celebrations.

 – Newly elected Micronesian President Manny Mori sent a letter to Samoan Prime Minister Tuila'epa Sa'ilele Malielegaoi stating that Malietoa Tanumafili II was a "great leader and pioneer of Samoa.... As a great leader of the Independent State of Samoa, His Highness Malietoa Tanumafili II was one of the prominent Samoan leaders leading up to its Independence in 1962.... His wisdom, leadership and dedication contributed to the forgoing and eventual inception of the Samoan Nation.... Our thoughts and prayers are with you during this time of national mourning."

 Baháʼí International Community – The governing body of the Baháʼís, the Universal House of Justice wrote: "His service to the people of Samoa as Head of State was distinguished by the high principles, genuine compassion and personal humility that characterized the constancy of his concern for the welfare of all. As the first reigning sovereign to accept the Message of Baháʼu'lláh, he set a record that will forever illumine the annals of our Faith, one that future generations will increasingly extol. His great interest for well-nigh four decades in the Faith's progress was reflected in the enthusiastic affirmation of his belief whenever the opportunity presented itself and in the abiding joy with which he regarded the construction in 1984 of the Mother Temple of the Pacific Islands in Samoa...."

Honours
Queen Elizabeth II visited Samoa for a single day in 1977 as part of her visit to the South Pacific on board the Royal Yacht Britannia. While in Samoa, Elizabeth presented Malietoa with the Collar Badge and Star of a Knight Grand Cross of the Order of St Michael and St George.

Also bestowed on Malietoa was the title of Honorary Commander of the Order of the British Empire during his life.

References

External links
Obituary from the New Zealand Herald
Uncertain times ahead as Samoa deals with new order
New Zealand Order of Merit Roll
Photograph Taken in 2006
 His Highness Malietoa Tanumafili II's Obituary
 His Highness Malietoa Tanumafili II's Condolence Book

|-

|-

Malietoa
O le Ao o le Malo of Samoa
1913 births
2007 deaths
Commanders of the Order of the British Empire
Knights Grand Cross of the Order of St Michael and St George
Samoan Bahá'ís
20th-century Bahá'ís
21st-century Bahá'ís
1940s in Western Samoa Trust Territory
1950s in Western Samoa Trust Territory
1960s in Samoa
1970s in Samoa
1980s in Samoa
1990s in Samoa
2000s in Samoa
20th-century Samoan politicians
21st-century Samoan politicians